N. Palanivel is an Indian politician and former Member of the Legislative Assembly of Tamil Nadu. He was elected to the Tamil Nadu legislative assembly as a Communist Party of India (Marxist) candidate from Palani constituency in 1977 election, 1980, and 1989 elections.

References 

Members of the Tamil Nadu Legislative Assembly
Communist Party of India (Marxist) politicians from Tamil Nadu
Living people
Year of birth missing (living people)